Victoria Walusansa-Abaliwano (née Victoria Walusansa), is a Ugandan  physician and oncologist, who works as the Deputy Director of the Uganda Cancer Institute (UCI), a cancer treatment and research institution, based in Kampala, Uganda and serving the countries of the African Great Lakes area.

Background and education
She was born in the Central Region of Uganda, circa 1972. In 1992, she was admitted to Makerere University School of Medicine, graduating in 1997 with a Bachelor of Medicine and Bachelor of Surgery (MBChB) degree. Four years later, she returned and enrolled in the postgraduate programme, graduating in 2004 with a Master of Medicine (MMed) degree in Internal Medicine. Later, for a period of 14 months, from July 2007 until August 2008, she trained as a post-doctoral Oncology Fellow, at the Fred Hutchinson Cancer Research Center, in Seattle, Washington, USA.

Work experience
In 2004, after her MMed studies at Makerere, she reported to work at Uganda Cancer Institute, to work and study under the Director of the Institute, Dr. Jackson Orem, who at the time, was the only trained specialist oncologist at UCI. But Dr. Orem had just been appointed as executive director and was very busy, so she was on her own most of the time.

In 2007, an opportunity came up in the form of a full scholarship to train as an oncology fellow at the Fred Hutch Cancer Research Center in Washington state. She took the opportunity, supported by her family and her employer. She is the first Ugandan doctor to undergo the oncology fellowship training at Fred Hutch. As of August 2014, a total of 16 Ugandan oncologists had undergone the training.

As of November 2017, Victoria Walusansa-Abaliwano is the Deputy Director and Head of Clinical Services at UCI. She also worked as a lecturer in the Department of Medicine, at the adjacent Makerere University College of Health Sciences (MUCHS), until her resignation in May 2011.

Family
She is married to Mark Abaliwano, a dental surgeon, and together are the parents of three daughters.

See also
 Cissy Kityo
 Edward Katongole-Mbidde
 Charles Olweny

References

External links
Website of the Uganda Cancer Institute
Breast cancer more aggressive in men

Living people
1972 births
Ganda people
Ugandan women physicians
Makerere University alumni
People from Central Region, Uganda
Ugandan oncologists
Ugandan healthcare managers
21st-century Ugandan women scientists
21st-century Ugandan scientists
Fred Hutchinson Cancer Research Center people